Broadmere is a rural locality in the Shire of Banana, Queensland, Australia. In the  Broadmere had a population of 44 people.

History 
In the  Broadmere had a population of 44 people.

Road infrastructure
The Leichhardt Highway passes to the south-east, and the Taroom Bauhinia Downs Road (State Route 7) to the north-east.

References 

Shire of Banana
Localities in Queensland